Nadir Nariman oglu Salifov (28 August 1972 – 19 August 2020), nicknamed Heart (Guli in Georgian), was a top Azerbaijan crime boss, notorious gangster and convicted criminal believed to be one of the richest of the criminal fraternity.

Early life
Salifov was born in Dmanisi, Georgian SSR to an Azerbaijani turk family.

Criminal activity

Early activities and imprisonment
His first documented run-in with the law was in Baku, Azerbaijan during 1995 on false charges according to Salifov. By law, Azerbaijani authorities can hold a suspect for up to 72 hours. Salifov was detained for eight months. He claims he was held under barbaric conditions: a starvation diet barely adequate for subsistence; no fresh water; no facilities for washing, shaving or cutting his hair or nails; and no medical care.

On 19 July 1996, at age 24, he was convicted of the murder of two rival gang members, despite his protestations of innocence. At the time of his arrest, he was in possession of a Stechkin APS machine pistol, a weapon that at that time only the head of the Azerbaijani Ministry of Internal Affairs, the MVD, was thought to possess. Salifov was given the death penalty but the presiding judge commuted the sentence to 15 years' imprisonment. Ten of those 15 years were spent in solitary confinement.

Two months after he was imprisoned, authorities arrested his father and placed him in the same prison. While there his father came under repeated pressure to denounce and accuse him, but these attempts met with no success.

According to Salifov's lawyer, at the time of his arrest he was carrying a passport of the former USSR issued in Georgia. Salifov appears not to have applied for citizenship during these years spent in prison.

While in prison Salifov had an additional 16 years added to his original 15-year sentence, as a result of assault charges filed by a female visitor. She, however, later withdrew her story and claimed to have made the original allegations under duress. At the same time, Salifov was informed that his 10 years in solitary would not count towards his release date. He used contacts and ingenuity to maintain various profitable criminal enterprises during his incarceration. He also possessed a cell phone, having four different numbers with which he kept contact with criminal associates who had been released and were at large. By these means he conducted an extortion racket against various Azerbaijani businesses and individuals. Salifov is also believed, with the assistance of his brother and through bribing prison authorities, to have arranged for at least eight women to be taken in to the prison for sexual purposes. In some cases this was allegedly against the women's will and resulted in rape. He is also believed to have made similar arrangements for certain fellow prisoners. Some of the women subsequently made allegations of rape and coercion, but these never reached court.

In 2010, while Salifov was still in prison, there was a turf war known as The Dill War between associates of Nadir Salifov and those of Rovshan Janiyev (known as Rovshan Lenkoransky) over acquiring the green grocers markets in Moscow and on its Ring Road, which had previously been operated by convicted criminal Bakic Aliyev. Four men with criminal histories were killed during this conflict. In 2014 there was more struggling for the lucrative markets which led to a "Wild Western-style" gunfight during a meeting of the competing clans in the Absheron cafe in Moscow in which one man was killed with several suffering gunshot wounds. Salifov denied all these claims as baseless attempts to sully his good name and reputation.

After prison release activities
Upon his release from prison in 2017, Salifov wasted no time in establishing his dominance in the existing underworld. Even while in prison, he had a huge influence on a part of the criminal world, both on criminals and on other community members, especially in places where the Azerbaijani diaspora was present.

He was marked as a potential replacement for Rovshan Lenkoransky, the convicted criminal murdered the previous year. This tied in with reports from early 2017 that Janiyev's underboss Agayar Agayev (aka Sedoy, Russian for "grey-haired"), who used to control the Yekaterinburg market, was now representing Salifov's interests. This appeared to be the case despite the fact that there was no love lost between Salifov and Rovshan Lenkoransky.

In December 2017 Russian police were attempting to defuse a tense situation in which Chechen criminals under Aziz Batukaev had been trying to take control of the green grocer markets held by Salifov's group. Nadir Salifov had laid claims to the Food City market in Moscow controlled by Rovshan Lenkoransky's proxies. According to police, the war for the largest wholesale food market in the capital was just getting going.

In March 2018, an Azeri claiming to be an exiled journalist, Rahim Namazov, was ambushed in the suburbs of Toulouse, France. Namazov was seriously wounded in the attack and his wife died of her injuries. Unsubstantiated claims suggest that this attack may have been ordered by Salifov as payback for previous insults and offenses.

Requests for Salifov's arrest were made through Interpol to Georgian, Russian and Ukrainian authorities, but to no avail. Recently, Salifov was detained briefly in the UAE and Montenegro but no extradition took place. It is believed that he may have been residing in Turkey, but could not be confirmed.

Death
Salifov was shot dead on 19 August 2020 at a restaurant in Antalya, Turkey by his own bodyguard, nicknamed "Khan".

References 

1972 births
2020 deaths
21st-century criminals
Russian people of Azerbaijani descent
Russian gangsters
People from Dmanisi
Georgian Azerbaijanis
Deaths by firearm in Turkey